Ormerod Terrace is a ramplike rock platform,  long, that parallels the southern flank of McSaveney Spur in the Willett Range, and declines moderately toward the Webb Glacier. It was named by the Advisory Committee on Antarctic Names in 2005 after Robin Ormerod, editor from 1984 to 1995 of Antarctic, the widely read publication of the New Zealand Antarctic Society.

References

Victoria Land
Willett Range